Michelle Izmaylov (born March 30, 1991) is an American physician and writer of fantasy-fiction books for young adults. She is the author of the bestseller Dream Saver, and currently serves as an Assistant Professor of Clinical Medicine at Vanderbilt University Medical Center.

Early life and education
Michelle Izmaylov was born March 30, 1991, in Los Angeles, California. She is a first-generation Russian American, and lives in Atlanta, Georgia.

Izmaylov graduated from Alpharetta High School in 2009. In the previous year, she was selected as a member of 21st Century Leader's 20 Under 20.

She completed training as a resident physician in internal medicine at Vanderbilt University Medical Center after graduating from the Vanderbilt University School of Medicine as a Cornelius Vanderbilt Scholar and from Emory University in May 2013 with a Bachelor of Science in Biology and Chemistry.

Career
 The Pocket Watch, Izmaylov's first novel, was published when she was 13. Izmaylov's second book, Dream Saver, was published traditionally through Mercury Publishing when Izmaylov won an essay contest with the publisher. The book rose to number 5 on Barnes & Noble's daily Top 10 fantasy fiction best-seller list. 

In May 2009, she joined FutureWord Publishing as Editor of Science-Fiction, Fantasy and Futuristic novels. In May 2011, she also joined World Castle Publications as a book illustrator. Her illustrated titles include Squazles! and Dart and the Squirrels. 

Her third novel, Galaxy Watch, was awarded the 2011 Forward National Literature Award (Second Place, General Fiction). In 2013, she won the Artistine Mann Award in Creative Non-Fiction. She was also selected by Salman Rushdie for his Master Class in Creative Writing. Her novella Ricochet was published in June 2013.

Her most recent literary work explores narrative medicine. She received first place in the 2016 national Gold – Hope Tang, MD Humanism in Medicine Essay Contest for "Your Soul is Not Concrete." Her medical essays, such as "Two Creams, Three Sugars" and "The Seventh Year", have been published widely in some of the most recognized medical journals such as the Journal of General Internal Medicine, Journal of the American Geriatrics Society, the American Journal of Kidney Diseases, Academic Medicine, and Academic Emergency Medicine. 

In 2020, while finishing her residency training and beginning work as a hospitalist on the front lines of the coronavirus pandemic, she partnered with Dr. Thea Tran to raise over $8,000 in one week to support the Nashville VA environmental services staff. This served as a launching point for the From Two Doctors project with a goal to share the stories of those who have been impacted by the pandemic. The project won a grant from the "Vessi Community Fund" in addition to receiving sponsorships from many national companies.

References

External links
 20 Under 20
 Atlanta Journal-Constitution Interview
 CNN Interview
 FutureWord Publishing
 Forward Literature Award
 
 North Fulton Newspaper
 Emory Creative Writing Department
 The Tennessean
 NewsChannel 5

1991 births
Living people
21st-century American novelists
American fantasy writers
American women novelists
American writers of Russian descent
Women science fiction and fantasy writers
21st-century American women writers
Writers from Los Angeles
Writers from Atlanta
Novelists from Georgia (U.S. state)
21st-century American physicians